The enzyme 2,3-dimethylmalate lyase catalyzes the chemical reaction

(2R,3S)-2,3-dimethylmalate  propanoate + pyruvate

This enzyme belongs to the family of lyases, specifically the oxo-acid-lyases, which cleave carbon-carbon bonds.  The systematic name of this enzyme class is (2R,3S)-2,3-dimethylmalate pyruvate-lyase (propanoate-forming). Other names in common use include 2,3-dimethylmalate pyruvate-lyase, and (2R,3S)-2,3-dimethylmalate pyruvate-lyase.  This enzyme participates in c5-branched dibasic acid metabolism.

References

 
 

EC 4.1.3
Enzymes of unknown structure